The Standards for Educational and Psychological Testing is a set of testing standards developed jointly by the American Educational Research Association (AERA), American Psychological Association (APA), and the National Council on Measurement in Education (NCME).

The new edition of The Standards for Educational and Psychological Testing was released in July 2014. Five areas received particular attention in the 2014 revision:
1. Examining accountability issues associated with the uses of tests in educational policy
2. Broadening the concept of accessibility of tests for all examinees
3. Representing more comprehensively the role of tests in the workplace
4. Taking into account the expanding role of technology in testing
5. Improving the structure of the book for better communication of the standards

Previous versions 
It was published on 1985, the 1999 Standards for Educational and Psychological Testing has more in-depth background material in each chapter, a greater number of standards, and a significantly expanded glossary and index. The 1999 version Standards reflects changes in United States federal law and measurement trends affecting validity; testing individuals with disabilities or different linguistic backgrounds; and new types of tests as well as new uses of existing tests. The Standards is written for the professional and for the educated layperson and addresses professional and technical issues of test development and use in education, psychology and employment.

Overview of organization and content

Part I: Test Construction, Evaluation, and Documentation 
1. Validity 
2. Reliability and Errors of Measurement 
3. Test Development and Revision 
4. Scales, Norms, and Score Comparability 
5. Test Administration, Scoring, and Reporting 
6. Supporting Documentation for Tests

Part II: Fairness in Testing 
7. Fairness in Testing and Test Use 
8. The Rights and Responsibilities of Test Takers 
9. Testing Individuals of Diverse Linguistic Backgrounds 
10. Testing Individuals with Disabilities

Part III: Testing Applications 
11. The Responsibilities of Test Users 
12. Psychological Testing and Assessment 
13. Educational Testing and Assessment 
14. Testing in Employment and Credentialing 
15. Testing in Program Evaluation and Public Policy

Related standards 

In 1974, the Joint Committee on Standards for Educational Evaluation was charged with the responsibility of writing a companion volume to the 1974 revision of the Standards for Educational and Psychological Tests. This companion volume was to deal with issues and standards for program and curriculum evaluation in education. In 1975, the Joint Committee began work and ultimately decided to establish three separate sets of standards. These standards include The Personnel Evaluation Standards, The Program Evaluation Standards, and The Student Evaluation Standards.

See also 
Standard-setting study

Notes and references 
  The Standards for Educational and Psychological Testing
  American Educational Research Association. (1977, September 12). Joint Committee on Standards for Educational Evaluation Update—September 1977.

External links 
 The Standards for Educational and Psychological Testing (teststandards.org)
 The Standards for Educational and Psychological Testing (apa.org)
 The Standards for Educational and Psychological Testing (aera.net)
 

Standards-based education
Psychometrics
Psychological testing
Standardized tests in the United States